Cilastatin inhibits the human enzyme dehydropeptidase.

Uses
Dehydropeptidase is an enzyme found in the kidney and is responsible for degrading the antibiotic imipenem. Cilastatin can therefore be combined intravenously with imipenem in order to protect it from degradation, prolonging its antibacterial effect. 

Imipenem alone is an effective antibiotic and can be given without cilastatin.  Cilastatin itself does not have antibiotic activity, although it has been proved to be active against a zinc-dependent beta-lactamase that usually confers antibiotic resistance to certain bacteria, more precisely, the carbapenem family of antibiotics. This property is due to the physicochemical similarities between membrane dipeptidase (MDP), the compound it is usually set to target, and the bacterial metallo-beta-lactamase carried by the CphA gene. The combination allows the antibiotic to be more effective by changing the pharmacokinetics involved. Thus imipenem/cilastatin, like amoxicillin/clavulanic acid, is a commonly used combination product.

References

Hydrolase inhibitors
Amino acid derivatives
Thioethers
Dicarboxylic acids